Video Yesteryear of Sandy Hook, Connecticut was the largest catalog retailer of public domain films on VHS, Betamax, and 8mm film beginning in 1978. Originally known as Radio Yesteryear from 1967, the company distributed old radio shows on LP records, audio cassettes, reel-to-reel, and, for a short time, 8-track tapes.

Radio Yesteryear began to release radio shows in 1970 in LP form on their Radiola Records imprint. Later they released records under a second imprint called Sandy Hook Records, which was designated as a "music-only" label. They released music broadcasts and film soundtracks, and reissued commercial recordings that had been out of print for many years.

When LPs began to be phased out, Radiola and Sandy Hook became cassette-only formats. Shortly before the sale of the company, they started experimenting with the CD format.

They released "custom tapes" of radio programs from their archive. For $12 per hour, a customer could select shows to add to their own collections. They also began a catalogue of shows called Goldin Radio Library which eventually contained hundreds of preselected shows on cassette. The "Goldin" spelling is from the name of the company founder, J. David Goldin.

They also started a cassette/CD reissue series called Stacks Of 78s that contained recordings from their collection of 78 rpm records. Most of these were out-of-print recordings that had been unavailable for many years. They made no effort at sound restoration; thus, some of the releases had a great deal of scratches and surface noise.

As Video Yesteryear, they are best known for presenting silent films at slower speeds than a standard 16mm projector would normally show, bringing the early films closer to their silent film running time. This process was known as Video Accu-Speed and described as a "prism optical" process.  It unfortunately had the effect of making the film darker the closer it got to the edges.  Their silent film releases also included original organ scores composed and performed by Rosa Rio (1902–2010), who had been a theatre organist during the silent era.

The company was purchased by Audio Book Club in 1998.

References

Companies based in Fairfield County, Connecticut
Retail companies established in 1967
Film distributors of the United States
Newtown, Connecticut
Retail companies of the United States
1967 establishments in Connecticut
Home video distributors
Home video companies of the United States